Craig Hilary Walendy (born July 11, 1977, in New Brunswick, New Jersey) is a former professional American football fullback for the New York Giants in the National Football League.  He played college football for the UCLA Bruins.

External links
Craig Walendy stats

1977 births
Living people
Sportspeople from New Brunswick, New Jersey
American football fullbacks
UCLA Bruins football players
New York Giants players